Rustling A Bride is a lost  1919 silent film comedy-Western directed by Irvin Willat and starring Lila Lee.

Plot
As described in a film magazine, cowboy Nick McCredie (Blue) discovers the name and address of a Kentucky girl on the fly leaf of an old school book, writes to her, and as a joke includes the photograph of Pen Walton (Shumway), a fellow cowpuncher. In time a warm friendship develops between Emily (Lee) and Nick, and when her grandmother, her only living relative, dies and she is proposed to by an old man who coverts the farm, she flees to the west to marry Nick. He meets her at the rail station and tells he that he is Mr. Andy and that Nick sent him. She is disappointed as Nick had instantly won her. Walton, who thoroughly hates Nick, manufactures evidence that implicates Nick as a horse thief. The cowboys go in search of Nick while Emily falls into Walton's hands. She is held captive in a deserted shack in the desert where Walton has secreted valuable horses. Emily makes her escape, turns the horses loose, and reaches the ranch just in time to save Nick from being lynched. Ezra (Oliver), her guardian, arrives just as the wedding with Nick is about to be performed and is silenced by the heel of one of Nick's friends.

Cast
 Lila Lee as Emily
 Monte Blue as Nick McCredie
 L. C. Shumway as Pen Walton
 Manuel Ojeda as Pedro
 Ruby Lafayette as Aunt
 Guy Oliver as Ezry
 Alice Knowland as The School Mistress
 Jim Farley as Sheridan
 Charles McHugh as Irish 
 Dick La Reno as Sheriff
 Tom Walsh as Dan
 Roy Marshall as Joe

References

External links
 
 Synopsis at allmovie.com
 Period advertisement

1919 films
Films directed by Irvin Willat
Lost Western (genre) comedy films
Paramount Pictures films
1910s Western (genre) comedy films
1910s English-language films
American black-and-white films
Lost American films
1919 lost films
1919 comedy films
Silent American Western (genre) comedy films
1910s American films